Rev. Thomas Lee D.D. was a 19th-century academic administrator at the University of Oxford and clergyman.

Lee was awarded a Doctor of Divinity at Oxford.
He was president of Trinity College, Oxford, from 1808 to 1824.
While president at Trinity College, Lee was also vice-chancellor of Oxford University from 1814 until 1818.

The Allied sovereigns' visit to England occurred during June 1814 when Lee was vice-chancellor. Emperor Alexander I of Russia, King Frederick William III of Prussia, and Marshal Gebhard Leberecht von Blücher received honorary degrees during the visit to Oxford.

Lee was also rector at Barton in Warwickshire.

References

Year of birth missing
Year of death missing
Presidents of Trinity College, Oxford
Vice-Chancellors of the University of Oxford
19th-century English Anglican priests